Events in the year 2002 in Japan.

Incumbents
 Emperor: Akihito
 Prime Minister: Junichiro Koizumi (L–Kanagawa)
 Chief Cabinet Secretary: Yasuo Fukuda (L–Gunma)
 Chief Justice of the Supreme Court: Shigeru Yamaguchi until October 30, Akira Machida from November 6
 President of the House of Representatives: Tamisuke Watanuki (L–Toyama)
 President of the House of Councillors: Yutaka Inoue (L–Chiba) until April 22, Hiroyuki Kurata (L–Chiba)
 Diet sessions: 154th (regular, January 21 to July 31), 155th (extraordinary, October 18 to December 13)

Governors
Aichi Prefecture: Masaaki Kanda 
Akita Prefecture: Sukeshiro Terata 
Aomori Prefecture: Morio Kimura 
Chiba Prefecture: Akiko Dōmoto 
Ehime Prefecture: Moriyuki Kato 
Fukui Prefecture: Yukio Kurita
Fukuoka Prefecture: Wataru Asō 
Fukushima Prefecture: Eisaku Satō
Gifu Prefecture: Taku Kajiwara 
Gunma Prefecture: Hiroyuki Kodera 
Hiroshima Prefecture: Yūzan Fujita 
Hokkaido: Tatsuya Hori
Hyogo Prefecture: Toshizō Ido
Ibaraki Prefecture: Masaru Hashimoto 
Ishikawa Prefecture: Masanori Tanimoto
Iwate Prefecture: Hiroya Masuda 
Kagawa Prefecture: Takeki Manabe 
Kagoshima Prefecture: Tatsurō Suga 
Kanagawa Prefecture: Hiroshi Okazaki 
Kochi Prefecture: Daijiro Hashimoto 
Kumamoto Prefecture: Yoshiko Shiotani 
Kyoto Prefecture: Teiichi Aramaki (until 15 April) Keiji Yamada (starting 16 April)
Mie Prefecture: Masayasu Kitagawa 
Miyagi Prefecture: Shirō Asano 
Miyazaki Prefecture: Suketaka Matsukata 
Nagano Prefecture: 
 starting 15 July: Yasuo Tanaka
 16 July-5 September: Shuichi Abe
 starting 5 September: Yasuo Tanaka 
Nagasaki Prefecture: Genjirō Kaneko 
Nara Prefecture: Yoshiya Kakimoto
Niigata Prefecture: Ikuo Hirayama 
Oita Prefecture: Morihiko Hiramatsu 
Okayama Prefecture: Masahiro Ishii 
Okinawa Prefecture: Keiichi Inamine
Osaka Prefecture: Fusae Ōta 
Saga Prefecture: Isamu Imoto 
Saitama Prefecture: Yoshihiko Tsuchiya
Shiga Prefecture: Yoshitsugu Kunimatsu 
Shiname Prefecture: Nobuyoshi Sumita 
Shizuoka Prefecture: Yoshinobu Ishikawa 
Tochigi Prefecture: Akio Fukuda
Tokushima Prefecture: Toshio Endo (until 27 April); Tadashi Ōta (starting 28 April)
Tokyo: Shintarō Ishihara 
Tottori Prefecture: Yoshihiro Katayama 
Toyama Prefecture: Yutaka Nakaoki
Wakayama Prefecture: Yoshiki Kimura 
Yamagata Prefecture: Kazuo Takahashi 
Yamaguchi Prefecture: Sekinari Nii 
Yamanashi Prefecture: Ken Amano

Events

January
January 15: UFJ Bank founded via the merger of the Sanwa Bank, Ltd., the Tokai Bank, Ltd. and Toyo Trust and Banking Co., Ltd.
January 29: Prime Minister Koizumi fires Foreign Minister Makiko Tanaka.

February
February 1: Yoriko Kawaguchi is appointed foreign minister; her previous portfolio of Environment Minister is assumed by Hiroshi Oki.
February 19: U.S. president George W. Bush addresses a joint session of the Diet.

March
March 7: Futoshi Matsunaga and Junko Ogata are arrested for confinement of a 17-year-old girl. They are arrested for seven murders later.

April
April 1: Mizuho Bank founded.
April 1: Domestic Violence Prevention Act becomes effective.
April 21
E231 series trains are introduced on the Yamanote Line in Tokyo.
Koizumi visits Yasukuni Shrine.
April 22: The new official residence of the Prime Minister opens next to the old one in Nagatachō, Tokyo.

May
May 31: The World Cup Korea/Japan 2002 begins.

June
June 11: Solar eclipse visible throughout Japan.
June 24: Chiyoda ward in Tokyo bans smoking while walking in public.
June 30
The World Cup ends.
Izumi Garden Tower is completed.

August
August 30: The last Mazda 626 rolls off the production line after 23 years. Its successor, the 6, enters production on October 1.

September
September 17: Koizumi visits North Korea; Kim Jong-il admits to the North Korean abduction of Japanese citizens.

October
October 15: Five Japanese abductees return from North Korea.

November
November 1 – Renesas Technology, as predecessor of Renesas Electronics was founded.

December
December 1
Tōhoku Shinkansen extension to Hachinohe Station opens.
Saikyo Line and Rinkai Line extensions to Osaki Station open, allowing through service.
Iwate Ginga Line and Aoimori Railway begin operations.

The Nobel Prize
 Masatoshi Koshiba: 2002 Nobel Prize in Physics winner.
 Koichi Tanaka: 2002 Nobel Prize in Chemistry winner.

Births

March 25: Rio Sasaki, child actress
July 19: Sōta Fujii, professional shōgi player
September 7: Nao Kosaka, idol, model, actress and member of the Japanese girls idol group Hinatazaka46
December 20: Yuuna Sugiyama, actress and singer

Deaths
March 8: Sanji Hase, voice actor
April 10: Yuji Hyakutake, amateur astronomer
May 13: Morihiro Saito, aikidoka
May 16: Shoichi Arai, professional wrestling promoter
May 24: Toshihito Ito, actor
May 25: Genichi Kawakami, president of Yamaha Corporation from 1950 to 1977
June 13: Hideo Murata, rōkyoku and enka singer
June 15: Hideo Murota, actor
September 12: Mitsuo Ikeda, wrestler
October 12: Nozomi Momoi, AV idol
November 15: Sohn Kee-chung, marathon runner
December 15: Mr. C.B., thoroughbred racehorse
December 21: Prince Takamado
December 28: Koreyoshi Kurahara, screenwriter and director

See also
 2002 in Japanese television
 List of Japanese films of 2002

References

 
Years of the 21st century in Japan
Japan
Japan